Gavin Fleming (June 5, 1826 – May 17, 1890) was a Canadian merchant and political figure. He represented Brant North in the House of Commons of Canada from 1872 to 1882 as a Liberal member.

Fleming was born near Falkirk, Stirlingshire, Scotland, the son of John Fleming and Margaret Dobbie, and was educated there. He came to Canada in 1849; his parents had come to Upper Canada in 1831. Fleming was a merchant at Glenmorris until he retired from business in 1871 and served four years as treasurer for South Dumfries Township. In 1852, he married Margaret Laprairik. He was named a justice of the peace in 1863.

External links 
 
The Canadian parliamentary companion, 1877, CH Mackintosh
The History of the County of Brant, Ontario : containing a history of the county ..., CP Mulvany (1883)
Memorial Web page for Gavin Fleming

1826 births
1890 deaths
Liberal Party of Canada MPs
Members of the House of Commons of Canada from Ontario
Scottish emigrants to Canada
Canadian justices of the peace